Har Kareh (also Romanized as Har Kāreh; also known as Āḵāreh (Persian: اكاره) and Ar Kāreh) is a village in Jannatabad Rural District, Salehabad County, Razavi Khorasan Province, Iran. At the 2006 census, its population was 122, in 29 families.

References 

Populated places in   Torbat-e Jam County